Hercegovac is a village and a municipality in Bjelovar-Bilogora County, Croatia. In 2001 there were 2,791 inhabitants, of which 87% were Croats.

The population is distributed in 5 settlements:

 Hercegovac - population 1,267
 Ilovski Klokočevac - 172
 Ladislav - 468
 Palešnik - 547
 Velika Trnava - 337

History
In the late 19th and early 20th century, Hercegovac was part of the Bjelovar-Križevci County of the Kingdom of Croatia-Slavonia.

References

Municipalities of Croatia
Populated places in Bjelovar-Bilogora County